Kalk (or ) is the Eighth borough or Stadtbezirk of Cologne, Germany. Kalk was merged into the city of Cologne in 1910, the borough was formed in 1975.

The borough of Kalk borders with Mülheim to the North, Rheinisch-Bergischer Kreis to the East, the Cologne borough of Porz to the South and Deutz to the West.

History

Subdivisions 
Kalk consists of nine Stadtteile (city parts):

Education
The Kaiserin-Theophanu-Schule is located in Kalk.

The Japanische Schule Köln e.V. (ケルン日本語補習授業校 Kerun Nihongo Hoshū Jugyō Kō), a Japanese weekend school, holds its classes in the Kaiserin-Theophanu-Schule. It began holding classes there as of 20 August 2009.

Transportation 

Kalk is served by numerous railway stations and highways. Train stations include Köln-Trimbornstraße and numerous light rail stations of Cologne Stadtbahn line 1 and 9. The Bundesautobahn 3 and 4 connect Kalk with the Cologne Beltway.

References

External links 

 Official webpage of the district 

 
Boroughs and quarters of Cologne